Jasmin Mrkonja (born 9 October 1958) is a Bosnian retired professional handball player and former coach.

Playing career
Mrkonja started playing handball at hometown club Krivaja Zavidovići. He then joined Yugoslav giants Metaloplastika in 1983, staying there until 1987 and winning many major trophies during that period. Later he played for Sporting Club Gaeta in Italy.

Mrkonja represented Yugoslavia in the men's tournament at the 1980 Summer Olympics and was also part of the Yugoslav team that were crowned World Champions in 1986.

Coaching career
Mrkonja was head coach of the Bosnia and Herzegovina national handball team from 2003 until 2004.

Honours

Player
Metaloplastika
Yugoslav Handball Championship: 1983–84, 1984–85, 1985–86, 1986–87
Yugoslav Handball Cup: 1983–84, 1985–86
EHF Champions League: 1984–85, 1985–86

Yugoslavia
IHF World Men's Handball Championship: 1986

References

External links

Jasmin Mrkonja at sportsport.ba

1958 births
Living people
People from Zavidovići
Yugoslav male handball players
Bosnia and Herzegovina male handball players
Olympic handball players of Yugoslavia
Handball players at the 1980 Summer Olympics
Bosnia and Herzegovina handball coaches
Handball coaches of international teams